The Ames Community School District is the public school district for most of the city of Ames, Iowa. It is accredited by the North Central Association of Secondary Schools and Colleges and the Iowa Department of Education.

The district is entirely in Story County.

Schools
There are eight schools in the Ames Community School District, with one high and middle school, and six elementary schools.

Ames High School

Ames High School is located at 1921 Ames High Drive.

Ames Middle School
Ames Middle School is located on 3915 Mortensen Road.

Elementary ("Primary") schools
There are six elementary schools in the Ames Community School District.

Edwards
Edwards Elementary School is located on 820 Miller Ave.

Fellows
Fellows Elementary School is located on 1400 McKinley.

Meeker
Meeker Elementary School is located on 300 20th Street.

Kate Mitchell
Kate Mitchell Elementary School is located on 3521 Jewel Drive.

Abbie Sawyer
Abbie Sawyer Elementary School is located on 4316 Ontario Street.

Northwood Preschool Center
The Northwood building was an elementary school that was closed.  In the summer of 2009, the school district remodeled it for a preschool center.  Northwood is located on 302 Duff Avenue.

Other Buildings

Willson Beardshear Early Childhood Center
Willson Beardshear School is located on 920 Carroll Avenue. **Wilson Beardshear was closed in the summer of 2009. The Early Childhood Center was moved to Northwood school.

Roosevelt Elementary School
Roosevelt is located at 921 9th Street. Roosevelt was closed in 2005 due to budget constraints, and lagging enrollment. The building was credited as the second oldest in the ACSD.

Crawford Elementary School
Crawford is located at 415 Stanton Avenue. It was closed in 2001 and then remodeled into a district administrative building. Up until 2015, it was the only district administration building and is also the oldest building in the ACSD. The administrative offices became completely vacant in Spring 2016.

Media
 Channel 7 is the school district's Educational-access television cable TV channel, which is provided through Mediacom Cable Television as part of a franchise agreement with the City of Ames The district televises their school board meetings through this network.

See also
 Lists of school districts in the United States
 List of school districts in Iowa

References

External links
Official site
Ames High School
Ames Middle School
Edwards Elementary
Fellows Elementary
Meeker Elementary
Mitchell Elementary
Sawyer Elementary
Northwood Preschool

School districts in Iowa
Education in Story County, Iowa
Ames, Iowa